Richard Bulkeley (26 December 1717 – 7 December 1800) was an influential administrator in Nova Scotia from 1749 to 1800. Historian Phyllis Blakeley writes that Bulkeley, "assisted 13 governors and lieutenant governors from Cornwallis to Wentworth. In half a century of service he took part in the founding of Halifax, the immigration of New Englanders and loyalists, and the prosperity of the French revolutionary wars." During his lifetime, known for hosting dignitaries and grand parties, he was known as "the Father of the Province." When he died, he was the last surviving settler who arrived with Cornwallis.

Career 

During Father Le Loutre's War he was an Aide-de-camp to three consecutive Governors of Nova Scotia: Cornwallis, Hobson and Lawrence.

During the French and Indian War he also served on the Nova Scotia Council (1759-1800). Historian Blakney writes that Bulkeley was "noted for his lavish hospitality, entertaining and many other military men during the Seven Years' War and the American revolution.

Bulkeley's first home was opposite St Paul's. The dining room could seat 50. Wolfe used his home as his headquarters prior to the Siege of Louisbourg (1758) and Quebec (1759). (In 1911, the Nova Scotia Historical Society created a plaque to mark the location at Robert Standford's premises, 156-158 Hollis Street.) He converted this residence into his library and private office once he built his new home on Argyle Street.

Bulkeley helped negotiate the peace treaties that led to the Burying the Hatchet ceremony, which ended 75 years of warfare between the Mi'kmaq and the British.

In the 1780s, Richard Bulkeley (governor), and about twenty others founded a chess club, which met once a fortnight at the Great Pontack (Halifax).

He served in many capacities the crown and people of Nova Scotia and was governor from 1791 to 1792; Bulkeley was succeeded by Former New Hampshire Governor Sir John Wentworth.

Bulkeley was a friend of Historian William Cobbett, who visited him in Halifax.

The Carleton 

Apart from two churches, Bulkeley's home is the oldest building in Halifax, Nova Scotia (1760). Since 1867 his residence has been known as "The Carleton." Bulkeley built his new home on Argyle Street from stone he brought from the ruins of Louisbourg (1758). He also had installed the black marble mantel from the Governor's house at Louisbourg. At his new home in the 1780s, Bulkeley regularly entertained the future King William IV (abolished slavery in British Empire; had an affair with Governor Wentworth's wife Francis) as well as Prince Edward (father of Queen Victoria). He also held large levees there on New Year's Day and the queen's birthday, as well as dinners on St Patrick's and St George's days." He named his home Carleton House after Guy Carleton, 1st Baron Dorchester upon his visit to Halifax in 1786. Bulkeley's widow eventually sold the residence to Henry Hezekiah Cogswell (1816).

Life 

Bulkeley was born in Dublin, Ireland, the second son of Sir Lawrence Bulkeley and Elizabeth Freke. He married on 18 July 1750 Mary Rous, daughter of John Rous, at Halifax, Nova Scotia, and they had four sons; after her death, he married, on 26 July 1776, Mary Burgess at Halifax; and died there 7 December 1800. His burial place is reported to be marked by a rough stone in St. Paul's Church cemetery (Old Burying Ground (Halifax, Nova Scotia)), presumably close to the gravestone of his wife Mary Rous.

Legacy 
Bulkeley was instrumental in serving in the position or establishing the following:

 Charitable Irish Society of Halifax
 St. Paul's Church (Halifax)
 Secretary of Nova Scotia (35 years) (1759–93)
 Judge of Admiralty court (25 years)
 Member of Nova Scotia Council (41 years) (1759-1800)
 Brigadier General of Militia
 Secretary of Nova Scotia Council
 Register in Chancery
 Commander of Courts Escheat and Forfeiture
 Justice of the Peace for Nova Scotia
 Grand Master of Free-Masons
 Editor of the Halifax Gazette
 Warden of St. Paul's Church (Halifax) (50 years)
 Organist and Leader of St. Paul's choir
 Founder of King's College and Academy, Windsor
 President of Agricultural Society
 President of Chess, Pencil and Brush Clubs (30 years)
 Chairman and organizer of First Board of Fire Wards

Links 
 The Carleton
Bulkeley's rational for the Expulsion of the Acadians

References

Endnotes

Texts
 
 J.S.M., "Richard Bulkeley" in Collections of the Nova Scotia Historical Society, vol. 12 (1905) p. 62.
 Carleton House: Living history in Halifax by Erickson, Paul A., and Duffus, Graeme F., and Heritage Trust of Nova Scotia
Builders of Nova Scotia - Richard Bulkeley

Irish emigrants to Canada (before 1923)
1717 births
1800 deaths
Governors of the Colony of Nova Scotia
Canadian newspaper editors